The Lady from Boston is a 1951 French-American comedy film directed by Bernard Vorhaus and starring Paul Henreid, Merle Oberon and Paul Bonifas. The film is also known as Pardon My French.  A French-language version Dans la vie tout s'arrange was also made.

Henreid said he made the film because it was a commitment "to an old friend, Andre Sarve", a French producer. He says it was a "pleasant enough love story" and that Henreid acted as co producer with Sarve.

Plot
A Boston schoolteacher (Oberon) inherits a chateau in France, but on arriving to take over the property she discovers it is filled with squatters.

Cast
 Paul Henreid - Paul Rencourt 
 Merle Oberon - Elizabeth Rockwell 
 Paul Bonifas - Monsieur Bleubois 
 Maximilienne - Madame Bleubois 
 Jim Gérald - Monsieur Poisson 
 Alexandre Rignault - Rondeau 
 Martial Rèbe - Mobet 
 Dora Doll - Yvette 
 Laura Daryl - Mme. Mobet 
 Lucien Callamand - Inspector 
 Víctor Merenda - François 
 Gilberte Defoucault - Marie-Claire 
 Marina Vlady - Jacqueline 
 Gérard Rosset - Michel 
 Albert Culloz - André 
 Nicole Monnin - Marcelle 
 André Aversa - Pierrot

References

External links

1951 films
French comedy films
American comedy films
Films directed by Bernard Vorhaus
Films set in France
English-language French films
American multilingual films
French multilingual films
1950s multilingual films
Squatting in film
French black-and-white films
American black-and-white films
1950s English-language films
1950s American films
1950s French films